Jack Rose may refer to:
Jack Rose (cocktail), a classic cocktail
Jack Rose (colonial administrator) (1917–2009), RAF fighter pilot and British colonial administrator of Cayman Islands
Jack Rose (footballer) (born 1995), English professional footballer
Jack Rose (gambler) (1875–1947), American gambler and underworld figure in New York City
Jack Rose (guitarist) (1971–2009), American guitarist
Jack Rose (screenwriter) (1911–1995), Russian-born American screenwriter
Jack Rose (colonel) (1876–1973), South African chemist and army officer

See also
John Rose (disambiguation)

Rose, Jack